Mihail Avrionov (born 27 June 1980) is a former Bulgarian footballer who played as a forward.

Career
Avrionov started to play football on the junior teams of Levski Sofia. At the age of  18, he moved to FC Asenovets from Asenovgrad and played four years for this club in the Bulgarian amateur division. Avrionov then played two seasons in the amateur team Levski Karlovo. During the 2005–06 season, he made his official debut in professional football with FC Yantra.

During the 2007–08 season, Avrionov was the top scorer of Etar Veliko Tarnovo in the Bulgarian second division with 14 goals. He was also recognized as Etar's player of the season. In August 2008, the forward was transferred to Spartak Varna. He has been given the number 99 shirt.

References

Bulgarian footballers
1980 births
Living people
First Professional Football League (Bulgaria) players
PFC Lokomotiv Mezdra players
PFC Spartak Varna players
FC Etar 1924 Veliko Tarnovo players

Association football forwards
Footballers from Sofia